Zachary Clay (born July 5, 1995) is a Canadian artistic gymnast.

In 2014, he won the bronze medal in the men's artistic team all-around event at the 2014 Commonwealth Games held in Glasgow, Scotland. In 2017, he won the gold medal in the men's pommel horse event at the 2017 Pan American Individual Event Artistic Gymnastics Championships held in Lima, Peru.

In 2018, he won the bronze medal in the men's pommel horse event at the 2018 Commonwealth Games held in Gold Coast, Australia. The following year, he represented Canada at the 2019 Pan American Games held in Lima, Peru and he won the bronze medal in the men's artistic team all-around event.

References

External links 
 

Living people
1995 births
Place of birth missing (living people)
Canadian male artistic gymnasts
Gymnasts at the 2014 Commonwealth Games
Gymnasts at the 2018 Commonwealth Games
Commonwealth Games silver medallists for Canada
Commonwealth Games bronze medallists for Canada
Commonwealth Games medallists in gymnastics
Gymnasts at the 2019 Pan American Games
Medalists at the 2019 Pan American Games
Pan American Games medalists in gymnastics
Pan American Games bronze medalists for Canada
21st-century Canadian people
Medallists at the 2014 Commonwealth Games
Medallists at the 2018 Commonwealth Games